Zegrze Południowe  is a village in the administrative district of Gmina Nieporęt, within Legionowo County, Masovian Voivodeship, in east-central Poland.

The village has a population of 1,200.

References

Villages in Legionowo County